Oakley United Football Club are a Scottish football club based in Oakley, Fife. Formed in 1964, they play their home games at Blairwood Park. The club's colours are maroon and light blue. 

The team plays in the East of Scotland Football League, having moved from the SJFA East Region South Division in 2018.

In season 2005–06, they won the Fife District championship to gain promotion to the East Superleague, having been relegated from the same division in season 2004–05. At the end of season 2006–07 they were relegated from the East Superleague. 

The team has been managed since November 2018 by Stewart Kenny.

Honours
 East of Scotland League First Division Conference B: 2021–22
East Region Fife / Central Division: 2005–06, 2010–11
Fife & Lothians Cup: 1982–83
Fife Junior League winners: 1971–72, 1978–79, 1979–80, 1982–83, 1985–86, 1987–88, 2000–01, 2005–06
ACA Fife League Cup: 2005–06
Fife Junior Cup: 1987–88, 2004–05, 2006–07
Cowdenbeath Cup: 1970–71, 1982–83, 1995–96, 1998–99, 2001–02, 2003–04
Kingdom Kegs Cup: 2000–01, 2004–05, 2006–07
Stella Artois Cup: 2003–04

Former players

 Players that have played/managed in the top two tiers of the Scottish League or any foreign equivalent to this level (i.e. fully professional league).
 Players with full international caps.
 Players who have achieved success in the media or other professions.

  David Bingham
 Peter Goldie (Duloch Juniors legend)
  George Connelly
  Cammy Fraser
  John Fraser
  Ernie McGarr
  Willie Newbigging
  Ray Sharp
  Kenny Ward
  Terry Wilson
  Bobby Graham
  Lewis Peddie

References

External links
 Official site

Football clubs in Scotland
Scottish Junior Football Association clubs
Association football clubs established in 1964
Football clubs in Fife
1964 establishments in Scotland
East of Scotland Football League teams